Tryasinovsky is a rural locality (a khutor) and the administrative center of Tryasinovskoye Rural Settlement, Serafimovichsky District, Volgograd Oblast, Russia. The population was 673 as of 2010. There are 18 streets.

Geography 
Tryasinovsky is located 32 km northeast of Serafimovich (the district's administrative centre) by road. Gryazinovsky is the nearest rural locality.

References 

Rural localities in Serafimovichsky District